Gujarat flood may refer to:

2005 Gujarat flood
June 2015 Gujarat flood
July 2015 Gujarat flood
2017 Gujarat flood